Canard is French for duck, a type of aquatic bird.

Canard may also refer to:

Aviation 
Canard (aeronautics),  a small wing in front of an aircraft's main wing
Aviafiber Canard 2FL, a single seat recreational aircraft of canard design
Blériot V canard, an early French aircraft built by Louis Blériot in 1907, and one of the first monoplanes
Voisin Canard, aircraft developed by the Voisin brothers

Persons 
Marius Canard (1888–1982), French Orientalist and historian
Nicolas-François Canard (c. 1750 – 1833), French mathematician and economist

Places 
Canard, Nova Scotia, Canada, a group of hamlets and villages
Canard River, a river in Nova Scotia, Canada
Rivière-aux-Canards (River of the ducks), a village in New France (now Canada) from 1670 until 1755
Rivière aux Canards (Anticosti Island), a tributary of the Gulf of Saint Lawrence in L'Île-d'Anticosti, Quebec, Canada

Dishonesty
"Canard" is a dated term for a false  story, especially a fabricated one
Antisemitic canard, a false allegation defaming Jews or Judaism
Lie
Defamation

Other 
Canard Pars, fictional character from the Japanese science fiction manga series Mobile Suit Gundam SEED Astray
Canard PC, a French magazine devoted to computer gaming
 Canard, an alternative name of a diving plane, small wings attached to the front of a submarine or an automobile

See also 

Canardo (disambiguation)
Kenard, a character in the television series The Wire
Canary (disambiguation)